Henri Järvelaid (born 11 December 1998) is an Estonian professional footballer who plays as a left back for Estonian club Nõmme Kalju.

Club career
In 2014, Järvelaid trained with Tottenham Hotspur and Birmingham City academies, but the trials did not lead to a contract.

On 24 August 2020, Järvelaid moved to Danish 1st Division club Vendsyssel FF, signing a deal until June 2023. On 1 September 2021, Järvelaid left Vendsyssel and joined Norwegian club Sogndal IL on a deal for the rest of 2021.

Honours
Flora
Meistriliiga: 2017, 2019
Estonian Supercup: 2020

References

External links

1998 births
Living people
Footballers from Tallinn
Estonian footballers
Association football defenders
Estonia international footballers
Estonia youth international footballers
Estonia under-21 international footballers
Meistriliiga players
Danish 1st Division players
FC Flora players
Tartu JK Tammeka players
Vendsyssel FF players
Sogndal Fotball players
Estonian expatriate footballers
Estonian expatriate sportspeople in Denmark
Estonian expatriate sportspeople in Norway
Expatriate men's footballers in Denmark
Expatriate footballers in Norway
FC Nõmme United players